Reza Hekmat (1891 – 15 March 1978) was a Prime Minister of Iran. He became Prime Minister of Iran on 18 December 1947 and was in office until 29 December 1947 for only 11 days.

He was a speaker of Parliament of Iran from 1947 to 1955.

He was born in Shiraz in 1891 and died in Tehran in 1978 at the age of 87. Some sources claim that Hekmat’s paternal family were Iranian Jews who had converted to Islam during the mid-nineteenth century.

See also
Pahlavi dynasty
List of prime ministers of Iran

References

Prime Ministers of Iran
1891 births
1978 deaths
20th-century Iranian people
Democrat Party of Iran politicians
Speakers of the National Consultative Assembly
Grand Crosses 1st class of the Order of Merit of the Federal Republic of Germany
Members of the 4th Iranian Majlis
Members of the 5th Iranian Majlis
Members of the 7th Iranian Majlis
Members of the 8th Iranian Majlis
Members of the 14th Iranian Majlis
Members of the 15th Iranian Majlis
Members of the 16th Iranian Majlis
Members of the 18th Iranian Majlis
Members of the 19th Iranian Majlis
Members of the 20th Iranian Majlis
People from Shiraz